First Class Chefs is a British television cooking series that airs on Disney Channel. The series stars the famous chef Michel Roux Jr. The series premiered in the United Kingdom on 22 June 2015. The series was produced by Fresh One Productions.

Episodes

Series overview

Season 1 (2015)

References

2015 British television series debuts
British cooking television shows
Food reality television series
Cooking competitions in the United Kingdom
Disney Channel (British and Irish TV channel) original programming
English-language television shows